Where the Red Fern Grows is a 2003 American family adventure film directed by Lyman Dayton and Sam Pillsbury and starring Joseph Ashton, Dave Matthews, Ned Beatty and Dabney Coleman. Based on the children's book of the same name by Wilson Rawls and a remake of the 1974 film of the same name, it follows the story of Billy Colman who buys and trains two Redbone Coonhound hunting dogs to hunt raccoons in the Ozark mountains.

Plot
A senior-aged Billy Coleman rescues a beagle from stray dogs. He takes care of it, having a flashback to when he was a ten-year-old boy living in the Ozark mountains with his parents and two younger sisters.

Billy wants a pair of hunting dogs, but his parents cannot afford them. Billy tells his Grandpa that he believes that God does not want him to have dogs. His grandfather replies that he has to meet God halfway. After coming across an article in a sportsman magazine offering a pair of Redbone coonhounds, he earns the money himself by working for two years. He reveals the money to his Grandpa, having kept it a secret from his family, fearing his father would use it for a long-needed mule. Inspired by Billy's hard work, Grandpa promises him his hounds.

Weeks later, Billy learns that the dogs were delivered to Tahlequah, not to Grandpa's store. Grandpa assures Billy that he can get a ride in a week. Billy's impatience and concern for his pups' wellbeing drive him to sneak out the following night to walk to Tahlequah.

He reaches Tahlequah the following morning and gets his pups from the depot station. When Billy returns home the next day, everyone is thrilled with his new dogs, whom Billy has named Old Dan and Little Ann. Billy trains the pups to be hunting dogs. On his first night hunt, they chase a raccoon up a large sycamore. Though he is discouraged, he promises to cut the tree down. It takes him over a day, and he runs out of strength before finishing the job. After asking God for help, wind blows the tree down, allowing the dogs to finish the hunt.

Billy and his dogs become a hunting legend in the Ozarks, bringing in countless coon hides. While at his Grandpa's store, his rivals - Rubin and Rainie Pritchard - challenge him to a bet to hunt and chase the Ghost Coon, which seemingly disappears every time a dog trees it. Billy stays true to his morals and refuses. After goading him, however, his Grandpa is provoked to accept.

The boys and dogs hunt after the Ghost Coon, which seemingly disappears after being treed. However, Billy investigates a nearby shed and finds the coon hidden in the roof. The Pritchard Boys' hound dog, Old Blue, breaks free from the boys' bondage and pursues them. He gets into a scuffle with Old Dan, who overpowers Old Blue. As Billy climbs down to deescalate the fight, Rubin attempts to kill Old Dan with his hatchet. As Billy arrives, Rubin trips and falls on the axe. Rainie runs off to get help. Billy sees that Rubin is already dead. Ridden with guilt, Billy vows that he is done hunting.

Grandpa persuades Billy to enter Old Dan and Little Ann in a championship raccoon hunt in the Ozarks. Billy decides to accept, agreeing with Grandpa that Dan and Ann deserve to prove their worth. At the Coon Hunt, Billy, along with his father and grandfather, reunite with the sheriff from Tahlequah, who is collecting for the hunt's prize money and gold cup. During the hunt a thunderstorm strikes. Grandpa injures his leg after falling down a hill. Billy wins the hunt, and presents the prize money to his mother, and can finally afford to move from the Ozarks to Tulsa, something his mother always wanted for the family.

During a hunting night, the dogs are attacked by a mountain lion. Billy scares it off with his hatchet. Little Ann survives, but Old Dan is mortally wounded. The entire family mourns for the loss of Old Dan. A few days later, Billy finds Little Ann dead at Old Dan's grave, having succumbed to her grief. His father says that his dogs served their purpose as an answer to his mother's prayers for the move.

As the family packs for the move, Billy visits his dogs' graves one last time. He sees that a red fern has grown between their graves. As they move, older Billy narrates his desire to return to the Ozarks, "where the red fern grows".

Cast
Joseph Ashton as Billy Coleman
Dave Matthews as Will Coleman
Renee Faia as Jenny Coleman
Mac Davis as Hod Bellington
Kris Kristofferson as Older Billy Coleman
Ned Beatty as Sheriff Abe McConnell
Dabney Coleman as Grandpa

Reception
Common Sense Media rated the film 3 out of 5 stars.

See also
Key Underwood Coon Dog Memorial Graveyard
Rainbow Bridge (pets)
The Hunt (The Twilight Zone)
Variant Creutzfeldt–Jakob disease (Kuru) from eating squirrel brains.

References

External links
  
 
 

2003 films
2000s adventure films
2000s English-language films
2000s American films
American adventure films
Films about dogs
Films directed by Sam Pillsbury
Films set in the Ozarks